This following list features abbreviated names of mathematical functions, function-like operators and other mathematical terminology.

This list is limited to abbreviations of two or more letters. The capitalization of some of these abbreviations is not standardized – different authors might use different capitalizations.

 AC – Axiom of Choice, or set of absolutely continuous functions.
 a.c. – absolutely continuous.
 acrd – inverse chord function.
 ad – adjoint representation (or adjoint action) of a Lie group.
 adj – adjugate of a matrix.
 a.e. – almost everywhere.
 Ai – Airy function.
 AL – Action limit.
 Alt – alternating group (Alt(n) is also written as An.)
 A.M. – arithmetic mean.
 arccos – inverse cosine function.
 arccosec – inverse cosecant function. (Also written as arccsc.)
 arccot – inverse cotangent function.
 arccsc – inverse cosecant function. (Also written as arccosec.)
 arcexc – inverse excosecant function. (Also written as arcexcsc, arcexcosec.)
 arcexcosec – inverse excosecant function. (Also written as arcexcsc, arcexc.)
 arcexcsc – inverse excosecant function. (Also written as arcexcosec, arcexc.)
 arcexs – inverse exsecant function. (Also written as arcexsec.)
 arcexsec – inverse exsecant function. (Also written as arcexs.)
 arcosech – inverse hyperbolic cosecant function. (Also written as arcsch.)
 arcosh – inverse hyperbolic cosine function.
 arcoth – inverse hyperbolic cotangent function.
 arcsch – inverse hyperbolic cosecant function. (Also written as arcosech.)
 arcsec – inverse secant function.
 arcsin – inverse sine function.
 arctan – inverse tangent function.
 arctan2 – inverse tangent function with two arguments. (Also written as atan2.)
 arg – argument of
 arg max – argument of the maximum.
 arg min – argument of the minimum.
 arsech – inverse hyperbolic secant function.
 arsinh – inverse hyperbolic sine function.
 artanh – inverse hyperbolic tangent function.
 a.s. – almost surely.
 atan2 – inverse tangent function with two arguments. (Also written as arctan2.)
 A.P. – arithmetic progression.
 Aut – automorphism group.
 bd – boundary. (Also written as fr or ∂.)
 Bi – Airy function of the second kind.
 BIDMAS – Brackets, Indices, Divide, Multiply, Add, Subtract.
 Bias – bias of an estimator 
 BWOC – by way of contradiction
 Card – cardinality of a set. (Card(X) is also written #X, ♯X or |X|.)
 cas – cos + sin function.
 cdf – cumulative distribution function.
 c.f. – cumulative frequency.
 c.c. – complex conjugate.
 char – characteristic of a ring.
 Chi – hyperbolic cosine integral function.
 Ci – cosine integral function.
 cis – cos + i sin function. (Also written as expi.)
 Cl – conjugacy class.
 cl – topological closure.
 CLT – central limit theorem.
 cod, codom – codomain.
 cok, coker – cokernel.
 conv – convex hull of a set.
 Cor – corollary.
 corr – correlation.
 cos – cosine function.
 cosec – cosecant function. (Also written as csc.)
 cosech – hyperbolic cosecant function. (Also written as csch.)
 cosh – hyperbolic cosine function.
 cosiv – coversine function. (Also written as cover, covers, cvs.)
 cot – cotangent function. (Also written as ctg.)
 coth – hyperbolic cotangent function.
 cov – covariance of a pair of random variables.
 cover – coversine function. (Also written as covers, cvs, cosiv.)
 covercos – covercosine function. (Also written as cvc.)
 covers – coversine function. (Also written as cover, cvs, cosiv.)
 crd – chord function.
 csc – cosecant function. (Also written as cosec.)
 csch – hyperbolic cosecant function. (Also written as cosech.)
 ctg – cotangent function. (Also written as cot.)
 curl – curl of a vector field. (Also written as rot.)
 cvc – covercosine function. (Also written as covercos.)
 cvs – coversine function. (Also written as cover, covers, cosiv.)
 def – define or definition.
 deg – degree of a polynomial, or other recursively-defined objects such as well-formed formulas. (Also written as ∂.)
 del – del, a differential operator.
 det – determinant of a matrix or linear transformation.
 dim – dimension of a vector space.
 div – divergence of a vector field.
 DNE – a solution for an expression does not exist, or is undefined. Generally used with limits and integrals.
 dom – domain of a function. (Or, more generally, a relation.)
 End – categories of endomorphisms.
 Ei – exponential integral function.
 epi – epigraph of a function.
 Eqn – equation.
 erf – error function.
 erfc – complementary error function.
 etr – exponent of the trace.
 exc – excosecant function. (Also written as excsc, excosec.)
 excosec – excosecant function. (Also written as excsc, exc.)
 excsc – excosecant function. (Also written as excosec, exc.)
 exs – exsecant function. (Also written as exsec.)
 exsec – exsecant function. (Also written as exs.)
 exp – exponential function. (exp x is also written as ex.)
 expi – cos + i sin function. (Also written as cis.)
 expm1 – exponential minus 1 function. (Also written as exp1m.)
 exp1m – exponential minus 1 function. (Also written as expm1.)
 Ext – Ext functor.
 ext – exterior.
 extr – a set of extreme points of a set.
 FIP – finite intersection property.
 FOC – first order condition.
 FOL – first-order logic.
 fr – boundary. (Also written as bd or ∂.)
 Frob – Frobenius endomorphism.
 Gal – Galois group. (Also written as Γ.)
 gcd – greatest common divisor of two numbers. (Also written as hcf.)
 gd – Gudermannian function.
 GF – Galois field.
 GF – generating function.
 GL – general linear group.
 G.M. – geometric mean.
 glb – greatest lower bound. (Also written as inf.)
 G.P. – geometric progression.
 grad – gradient of a function.
 hacover – hacoversine function. (Also written as hacovers, hcv.)
 hacovercos – hacovercosine function. (Also written as hcc.)
 hacovers – hacoversine function. (Also written as hacover, hcv.)
 hav – haversine function. (Also written as sem.)
 havercos – havercosine function. (Also written as hvc.)
 hcc – hacovercosine function. (Also written as hacovercos.)
 hcv – hacoversine function. (Also written as hacover, hacovers.)
 hcf – highest common factor of two numbers. (Also written as gcd.)
 H.M. – harmonic mean.
 HOL – higher-order logic.
 Hom – Hom functor.
 hom – hom-class.
 hot – higher order term
 HOTPO – half or triple plus one
 hvc – havercosine function. (Also written as havercos.)
 hyp – hypograph of a function.
 iff – if and only if.
 IH – induction hypothesis.
 iid – independent and identically distributed random variables.
 Im – imaginary part of a complex number (Also written as ).
 im – image
 inf – infimum of a set. (Also written as glb.)
 int – interior.
 I.o. – Infinitely often.
 ker – kernel.
 lb – binary logarithm (log2). (Also written as ld.)
 lcm – lowest common multiple (a.k.a. least common multiple) of two numbers.
 LCHS – locally compact Hausdorff second countable.
 ld – binary logarithm (log2). (Also written as lb.)
 lerp – linear interpolation.
 lg – common logarithm (log10) or binary logarithm (log2).
 LHS – left-hand side of an equation.
 Li – offset logarithmic integral function.
 li – logarithmic integral function or linearly independent.
 lim – limit of a sequence, or of a function.
 lim inf – limit inferior.
 lim sup – limit superior.
 LLN – law of large numbers.
 ln – natural logarithm, loge.
 lnp1 – natural logarithm plus 1 function.
 ln1p – natural logarithm plus 1 function.
 log – logarithm. (If without a subscript, this may mean either log10 or loge.)
 logh – natural logarithm, loge.
 LST – language of set theory.
 lub – least upper bound. (Also written sup.)
 max – maximum of a set.
 MGF – moment-generating function.
 M.I. – mathematical induction.
 min – minimum of a set.
 mod – modulo.
 Mp – metaplectic group.
 mtanh – modified hyperbolic tangent function. (Also written as mth.)
 mth – modified hyperbolic tangent function. (Also written as mtanh.)
 mx – matrix.
 NAND – not-and in logic.
 No. – number.
 NOR – not-or in logic.
 NTS – need to show.
 OBGF – ordinary bivariate generating function.
 ob – object class.
 ord – ordinal number of a well-ordered set.
 pdf – probability density function.
 pf – proof.
 PGL – projective general linear group.
 Pin – pin group.
 pmf – probability mass function.
Pn – previous number.
 Pr – probability of an event. (See Probability theory.
 PSL – projective special linear group.
 PSO – projective orthogonal group.
 PSU – projective special unitary group.
 PU – projective unitary group.
 QED – "Quod erat demonstrandum", a Latin phrase used at the end of a definitive proof.
 QEF – "quod erat faciendum", a Latin phrase sometimes used at the end of a geometrical construction.
 ran – range of a function.
 rank – rank of a matrix. (Also written as rk.)
 Re – real part of a complex number. (Also written .)
 resp – respectively.
 RHS – right-hand side of an equation.
 rk – rank. (Also written as rank.)
 RMS, rms – root mean square.
 rng – non-unital ring.
 rot – rotor of a vector field. (Also written as curl.)
 RTP – required to prove.
 RV – random variable. (or as R.V.)
 R - Real numbers
 SD – standard deviation
 SE – standard error
 sec – secant function.
 sech – hyperbolic secant function.
 seg – initial segment of.
 sem – haversine function. (Also written as hav.)
 SFIP – strong finite intersection property.
 sgn – sign function.
 Shi – hyperbolic sine integral function.
 Si – sine integral function.
 sin – sine function.
 sinc – sinc function.
 sinh – hyperbolic sine function.
 siv – versine function. (Also written as ver, vers.)
 SL – special linear group.
 SO – special orthogonal group.
 SOC – second order condition.
 Soln – solution.
 Sp – symplectic group.
 Sp – trace of a matrix, from the German "spur" used for the trace.
 sp – linear span of a set of vectors. (Also written as span or written with angle brackets.)
 Spec – spectrum of a ring.
 Spin – spin group.
 s.t. – such that or so that or subject to.
 st – standard part function.
 STP – [it is] sufficient to prove.
 SU – special unitary group.
 sup – supremum of a set. (Also written as lub, which stands for least upper bound.)
 supp – support of a function.
 swish – swish function, an activation function in data analysis.
 Sym – symmetric group (Sym(n) is also written as Sn) or symmetric algebra.
 tan – tangent function. (Also written as tgn, tg.)
 tanh – hyperbolic tangent function.
 TFAE – the following are equivalent.
 tg – tangent function. (Also written as tan, tgn.)
 tgn – tangent function. (Also written as tan, tg.)
 Thm – theorem.
 Tor – Tor functor.
 Tr – trace, either the field trace, or the trace of a matrix or linear transformation.
 undef – a function or expression is undefined
 V – volume.
 var – variance of a random variable.
 vcs – vercosine function. (Also written as vercos.)
 ver – versine function. (Also written as vers, siv.)
 vercos – vercosine function. (Also written as vcs.)
 vers – versine function. (Also written as ver, siv.)
 W^5 – which was what we wanted. Synonym of Q.E.D.
 walog – without any loss of generality.
 wff – well-formed formula.
 whp – with high probability.
 wlog – without loss of generality.
 WMA – we may assume.
 WO – well-ordered set.
 WOP – well-ordered principle.
 wp1 – with probability 1.
 wrt – with respect to or with regard to.
 WTP – want to prove.
 WTS – want to show.
 XOR – exclusive or in logic.
 ZF – Zermelo–Fraenkel axioms of set theory.
 ZFC – Zermelo–Fraenkel axioms (with the Axiom of Choice) of set theory.

See also

 Greek letters used in mathematics, science, and engineering
 ISO 31-11
 Language of mathematics
 Mathematical Alphanumeric Symbols Unicode block 
 List of mathematical jargon
 Mathematical notation
 Notation in probability and statistics
 Physical constants
 List of mathematical uses of Latin letters
 List of logic symbols
 Glossary of mathematical symbols
 Mathematical operators and symbols in Unicode
 List of mathematical functions

References

Abbreviations
Abbreviations
Abbreviations
Abbreviations